Winston Tabb is the current Sheridan Dean of University Libraries and Museums at the Johns Hopkins University in Baltimore, Maryland.

Born in Tulsa, Oklahoma, Tabb received his B.A. from Oklahoma Baptist University and earned an M.A. from Harvard University as a Woodrow Wilson Fellow. After returning from Thailand as an instructor of English for the U.S. Army, Tabb received his degree in library science in 1972 from Simmons College. Upon his graduation from Simmons, he was recruited to join the professional staff of the Library of Congress.

During his tenure at the Library of Congress Tabb served in a variety of roles. In 1992, he was appointed as associate librarian and managed 53 of the library's divisions and offices.

In September 2002, Tabb became Sheridan Dean of University Libraries and director of the Sheridan Libraries at the Johns Hopkins University. In July 2006, Tabb was appointed for a two-year term as Vice Provost for the Arts at JHU. He also serves in other various offices: Director, the Sheridan Libraries, and Director of Historic Houses.

Sources
 Tabb's Webpage on the Johns Hopkins University official website.
 Article from the Library of Congress official website.

Year of birth missing (living people)
Living people
People from Tulsa, Oklahoma
Oklahoma Baptist University alumni
Harvard University alumni
Simmons University alumni
Librarians at the Library of Congress
Johns Hopkins University faculty